Danja Haslacher is an Austrian alpine skier who won five gold medals and one bronze medal at the Paralympic Games between 1998 and 2006. She also won the 2004 IPC Alpine Skiing World Championships Super G LW2 event.

Personal life
Haslacher has worked as a shop assistant and as a draughtswoman. She had her leg amputated in 1988 at the age of 17 after an accident.

Career
Haslacher started skiing in 1994. At the 1998 Winter Paralympics, Haslacher won the Super G and Giant Slalom LW2 events. At the 2002 Winter Paralympics, she won the Downhill, Slalom and Giant Slalom LW2 events. In 2004, Haslacher won the IPC Alpine Skiing World Championships Super G LW2 event. At the 2006 Winter Paralympics, Haslacher was the Austrian flag bearer at the Opening Ceremony. At the Games, she came third in the Super G standing event and fifth in the downhill standing event. Haslacher competed at the 2009 IPC Alpine Skiing World Championships in Pyeongchang, South Korea. In the same year, Haslacher fractured her leg in four places and required a long period of rehabilitation. She came second in the standing event at the 2011–12 FIS Alpine Ski Europa Cup.

Haslacher was unable to compete at the 2014 Winter Paralympics in Sochi, Russia, due to a tibia injury. In March 2014, she retired from skiing.

Honours
In 2002, Haslacher was named Austrian Disabled Sportsperson of the Year.

References

External links

Living people
Austrian female alpine skiers
Paralympic alpine skiers of Austria
Paralympic gold medalists for Austria
Paralympic bronze medalists for Austria
Alpine skiers at the 1998 Winter Paralympics
Alpine skiers at the 2002 Winter Paralympics
Alpine skiers at the 2006 Winter Paralympics
Medalists at the 1998 Winter Paralympics
Medalists at the 2002 Winter Paralympics
Medalists at the 2006 Winter Paralympics
Sportspeople from Salzburg
Paralympic medalists in alpine skiing
Year of birth missing (living people)
21st-century Austrian women